Whiteley Township is a township in Greene County, Pennsylvania, United States. The population was 572 at the 2020 census, down from 649 at the 2010 census.

History
The Hamilton-Ely Farmstead and George West Gordon Farm are listed on the National Register of Historic Places.

Geography
Whiteley Township is southeast of the center of Greene County, between Waynesburg to the north and Mount Morris to the south. Interstate 79 passes through the eastern side of the township, with access from Exit 7 (Kirby Road). U.S. Route 19 passes through the center of the township, running roughly parallel to I-79, and goes through Kirby, the main settlement in the township.

Surrounding neighborhoods
Whitely Township has six borders, including the townships of Jefferson to the north-northeast,  Greene from the northeast to the east, Dunkard to the southeast, Perry to the south, Wayne to the southwest and Franklin from the west to the north.

Demographics

As of the census of 2000, there were 754 people, 283 households, and 213 families residing in the township.  The population density was 24.1 people per square mile (9.3/km).  There were 320 housing units at an average density of 10.2/sq mi (4.0/km).  The racial makeup of the township was 98.54% White, 0.13% African American, 0.53% Native American, 0.13% Asian, and 0.66% from two or more races. Hispanic or Latino of any race were 0.53% of the population.

There were 283 households, out of which 42.0% had children under the age of 18 living with them, 64.0% were married couples living together, 7.8% had a female householder with no husband present, and 24.7% were non-families. 21.2% of all households were made up of individuals, and 8.1% had someone living alone who was 65 years of age or older.  The average household size was 2.66 and the average family size was 3.12.

In the township the population was spread out, with 26.9% under the age of 18, 8.0% from 18 to 24, 31.4% from 25 to 44, 22.9% from 45 to 64, and 10.7% who were 65 years of age or older.  The median age was 36 years. For every 100 females, there were 95.3 males.  For every 100 females age 18 and over, there were 96.8 males.

The median income for a household in the township was $33,438, and the median income for a family was $39,464. Males had a median income of $35,375 versus $18,125 for females. The per capita income for the township was $14,906.  About 15.9% of families and 18.2% of the population were below the poverty line, including 24.9% of those under age 18 and 14.3% of those age 65 or over.

References

Townships in Greene County, Pennsylvania
Townships in Pennsylvania